Zipper Creek is a river in the City and Borough of Juneau, Alaska, United States. It flows southward past Taku Glacier and ends at the head of Taku Inlet. Nancy Bartley of The Seattle Times attributes the naming to photographer Austin Post.

References

Rivers of Juneau, Alaska
Rivers of Alaska